Aurora Cotop (born July 13, 2002) is a retired Canadian figure skater. She is the 2019 Bavarian Open bronze medalist and 2019 Canadian national silver medalist. Earlier in her career, she won the junior ladies' title at the 2017 Canadian Championships and competed in the final segment at the 2018 World Junior Championships.

Personal life 
Cotop was born on July 13, 2002, in Toronto, Ontario, Canada. She is of Romanian descent.

Career

Early years 
Cotop began learning to skate in 2005. She won the novice ladies' title at the 
2016 Canadian Championships and the junior ladies' title the following year, at the 2017 Canadian Championships.

2017–2018 season 
Cotop made her ISU Junior Grand Prix (JGP) debut in August, placing seventh in Brisbane, Australia. In October, she finished ninth at her second JGP assignment, in Gdańsk, Poland. Competing in the senior ranks, she won gold at the Skate Canada Challenge in December. As a result, she qualified to compete on the same level at the 2018 Canadian Championships, where she would place fifth. 

She was then selected to represent Canada at the 2018 World Junior Championships in Sofia. In Bulgaria, she qualified to the free skate by placing twenty-first in the short program and went on to finish seventeenth overall.  Following this, Cotop decided to move to Edmonton to train with Ravi Walia, the coach of Olympic and World medalist Kaetlyn Osmond.

2018–2019 season 
Cotop's move to Edmonton was complicated by a pelvic fracture and bone marrow edema which limited her jump content.  She placed eleventh at her lone JGP assignment, the 2018 JGP Slovenia, and subsequently withdrew from what would have been her senior debut on the ISU Challenger Series.  In December 2018, Cotop finished fourth at the Skate Canada Challenge. 

In January, she won silver at the 2019 Canadian Championships after placing sixth in the short program and second in the free skate.  Cotop praised her new coach Walia, and said her free skate that it was "one of my best programs, because my run-throughs weren’t as good, so I feel like I sort of rose to the occasion."  Despite finishing in second place, Cotop lacked the senior technical minimums required to compete at the remaining senior ISU Championships for the season.  Skate Canada subsequently assigned her to the Bavarian Open, in the hopes of obtaining them.  She won the bronze medal at the Bavarian Open, placing third in both segments, and obtaining the necessary technical minimum scores.  Cotop called the result "pretty good", but said she still needed to work on integrated more triple jumps into her program, in particular the Lutz.

On February 22, Skate Canada formally assigned Cotop to the Canadian team for the 2019 World Championships in Saitama, Japan.

2019–2020 season 
After placing first in her domestic summer competition, complications from a groin tendon injury forced Cotop to withdraw from her initial planned Challenger assignment, the Nebelhorn Trophy, as well as the 2019 Skate Canada International.

While recovering from her groin injury, Cotop began to experience serious back pain.  She attempted to compete at the 2020 Canadian Championships, but withdrew after placing twelfth in the short program.

Programs

Competitive highlights 
GP: Grand Prix; CS: Challenger Series; JGP: Junior Grand Prix

Detailed results

Senior level

Junior level

References

External links 
 
 
 Aurora Cotop at Skate Canada.

2002 births
Canadian female single skaters
Canadian people of Romanian descent
Living people
Figure skaters from Toronto